The Order of Mapungubwe is South Africa's highest honour. It was instituted on 6 December 2002, and is granted by the President of South Africa, for achievements in the international arena which have served South Africa's interests. The order originally had three classes, and was enlarged to four in 2004:
 Platinum (OMP), for exceptional and unique achievements
 Gold (OMG), for exceptional achievements
 Silver (OMS), for excellent achievements
 Bronze (OMB), for outstanding achievements.

The order is named after Mapungubwe, an ancient African nation which existed a thousand years ago in what is now the northern part of the Limpopo province.

The first recipient of the order (in the Platinum class) was the late former president Nelson Mandela.

Design
The badge is a horizontal oval above an inverted trapezium. Inside the oval frame is depicted a golden rhinoceros with the sun rising above Mapungubwe Hill in the background. The convex upper edge of the trapezium is decorated with a beadwork pattern and the sides are edged with sceptres. In the centre is an ornate crucible from which molten gold flows down to a red furnace. The South African coat of arms is displayed on the reverse.

The ribbon is gold, edged with a line of cream-coloured bead-like dots along each edge, and recurring cream-coloured rhinoceros silhouettes down the centre. All four classes are worn around the neck.

Recipients

2002
 Nelson Mandela – Platinum (national reconciliation and nation-building)
 Allan McLeod Cormack (posthumously) – Gold (for achievements in CT scanning)
 F. W. de Klerk – Gold (national reconciliation and nation-building)
 Basil Schonland (posthumously) – Gold (physicist and founding president of the Council for Scientific and Industrial Research)
 Peter Beighton – Bronze (research into the inherited disorders of the skeleton)
 Hamilton Naki – Bronze (medical science)

2003
No awards presented.

2004
 Sydney Brenner – Gold (medical science)
 Tshilidzi Marwala – Bronze (engineering science)
 Batmanathan Dayanand Reddy – Bronze (mathematics and science)

2005
 John Maxwell Coetzee – Gold (literature)
 Aaron Klug – Gold (medical science)
 Frank Nabarro – Gold (academics and physics)
 Tebello Nyokong – Bronze (research into the development of cancer treatments)
 Himladevi Soodyall – Bronze

2006
 Selig Percy Amoils – Silver (pioneering medical achievements)
 George Ellis – Silver (mathematics and science)
 Lionel Opie – Silver (knowledge and achievements in the field of cardiology)
 Patricia Berjak – Silver (seed biologist)

2007
 Claire Penn – Silver (speech and language pathology, sign language, aphasia)
 Sibusiso Sibisi – Silver (information technology, R&D)
 Valerie Mizrahi – Silver (biochemistry and molecular biology, including TB drug validation)

2008
 Doris Lessing – Gold (literature, contributing to the elimination of colonialism and apartheid)
 Wieland Gevers – Silver (higher education and medicine)
 Phuti Ngoepe – Silver (natural sciences, development of computer modelling studies at the University of Limpopo)
 Tim Noakes – Silver
 Pragasen Pillay – Silver (energy conservation)

2009
No awards presented.

2010
 Douglas Butterworth – Silver (betterment of the environment and sustainability of fisheries)
 Johann Lutjeharms – Silver (contribution to and achievements in oceanographic science)
 Monique Zaahl – Bronze

2011
 Pieter Steyn – Silver (contribution to and achievements in chemistry and biosynthesis of mycotoxins)

2012
 Oliver Tambo (posthumously) – Platinum (for exceptional leadership during the anti-apartheid struggle)
 Albert Luthuli (posthumously) – Platinum (for exceptional leadership during the anti-apartheid struggle)
 Barry David Schoub – Silver (for achievements in virology)
 Patience Mthunzi-Kufa – Bronze (for her contributions to the field of biophotonics and her invaluable contribution to scientific research in South Africa and internationally)

2013
 Bernie Fanaroff – Silver (for his excellent contribution to astronomy and dedication in putting South Africa on the map with the SKA Project)
 George Ekama – Silver (for research in water solutions)
 Glenda Gray – Silver (for research in mother-to-child transmission of HIV/AIDS)
 Malegapuru William Makgoba – Silver (for his pioneering work in transforming higher education)
 Quarraisha Abdool Karim – Bronze (for her work in the fields of HIV/AIDS and TB research)

2014
 Ismail Mohamed (posthumously) – Silver (for his contributions to mathematics and political liberation)
 Hendrik Simon Schaaf – Silver (for his contributions to medical science)
 William Soga (posthumously) – Silver (for his contributions to medicine and anthropology)
 Namrita Lall – Bronze (for her contributions to medical science)

2015
No awards presented.

2016
 Zwelakhe Sisulu – Gold (for his exceptional contribution to quality journalism; and as a reporter exposing the cruelties of apartheid and encouraging unity among the people of different political persuasions to fight for liberation)

2017
 Fulufhelo Nelwamondo – Silver (for his excellent contribution to the field of science, particularly electrical engineering)
 Siyabulela Lethuxolo Xuza – Silver (for his excellent contribution to scientific innovation at an early stage, proving to himself and others that through determination and hard work one can achieve new career heights)

2018
No awards presented.

2019
Bomo Edna Edith Molewa (posthumously) - Gold (for her efforts in environmental justice)
Malik Maaza – Silver (for his contributions to nano-science)
Ari Sitas – Silver (for his contributions to social science)
Thokozani Majozi – Bronze (for his contributions to mathematics, particularly the development of a novel mathematical technique for near-zero-effluent batch chemical facilities which enables the reuse of wastewater)

See also
 South African civil honours

References

External links
  South African government website
 South African Medals Website
 South African history website

Sources 

Awards established in 2002
2002 establishments in South Africa
Orders of South Africa